Gordon Edwin Hale (1 June 1923 – 9 September 1972) was an Australian rules footballer who played with Footscray in the Victorian Football League (VFL).

Notes

External links 

1923 births
1972 deaths
Australian rules footballers from Victoria (Australia)
Western Bulldogs players
Yarraville Football Club players
Golden Point Football Club players